Arthur Kitinas (born 29 November 1959) is an Australian former professional rugby league footballer who played in the 1970s, and coached in the 2000s. He played in the New South Wales Rugby League (NSWRL) competition.

A , Kitinas trialled with Sydney's Eastern Suburbs club and played just one top grade match, in 1977, before joining the South Sydney Rabbitohs the following season. The established hookers at the South Sydney club, Test player George Piggins along with Ken Stewart, saw the promising young Kitinas play very little first grade at that club either.

Kitinas spent time as an assistant coach at South Sydney before an unsuccessful stint in the main job in 2004, as a replacement for Paul Langmack.

Kitinas joined the Wests Tigers coaching team in 2006 and currently coaches the Balmain Ryde-Eastwood Premier League team. In 2006 and 2007 he also coached the Australian Fijians team.
Kitinas now coaches the South Sydney Rabbitohs SG Ball team

References

1959 births
Living people
Australian expatriate sportspeople in Fiji
Australian people of Greek descent
Australian rugby league coaches
Australian rugby league players
Rugby league hookers
Rugby league players from Sydney
South Sydney Rabbitohs coaches
South Sydney Rabbitohs players
Sydney Roosters players